Conger oligoporus is an eel in the family Congridae (conger/garden eels). It was described by Robert H. Kanazawa in 1958. It is a tropical, marine eel which is known from Hawaii and Guam, in the eastern central and western central Pacific Ocean. It dwells at a depth range of 2–507 metres, and leads a benthic lifestyle, inhabiting crevices of hard substrata. It feeds predominantly on finfish.

References

Conger
Fish of the Pacific Ocean
Taxa named by Robert H. Kanazawa
Fish described in 1958